Ernst, Prince of Hohenlohe-Langenburg may refer to:

Ernst I, Prince of Hohenlohe-Langenburg (1794-1860)
Ernst II, Prince of Hohenlohe-Langenburg (1863-1950), grandson of Ernst I